The Voice of the Heart (German: Die Stimme des Herzens) is a 1937 German drama film directed by Karlheinz Martin and starring Beniamino Gigli, Geraldine Katt and Ferdinand Marian.

The film's sets were designed by the art director Max Seefelder. It was shot at the Bavaria Studios in Munich.

Main cast
 Beniamino Gigli as Gino Mari 
 Geraldine Katt as Prinzessin Helene 
 Ferdinand Marian as Prinz Konstantin 
 Gina Falckenberg as Miss Mary Smith 
 Fritz Odemar as Graf Lossez 
 Gustav Waldau as Ferrat 
 Hubert von Meyerinck as Kammerdiener der Prinzessin 
 Hertha von Hagen as Hofdame der Prinzessin 
 Amedeo Grossi as Bianchi 
 Josef Eichheim as Diener 
 Gerti Ober as Pianistin 
 Max Weydner as Empfangschef im Hotel 
 Albert Spenger as Reporter

References

Bibliography 
 Parish, James Robert. Film Actors Guide. Scarecrow Press, 1977.

External links 
 

1937 films
Films of Nazi Germany
German drama films
1937 drama films
1930s German-language films
Films directed by Karlheinz Martin
Bavaria Film films
Films shot at Bavaria Studios
German black-and-white films
1930s German films